The 1974 Star World Championships were held in Laredo, Spain in 1974.

Results

References

Star World Championships
1974 in sailing
Sailing competitions in Spain